Stephen Wall (born 10 December 1959) is a former English cricketer. Wall was a right-handed batsman who bowled right-arm medium-fast. He was born in Ulverston, Lancashire.

Wall made his debut in county cricket for Cumberland in the 1983 Minor Counties Championship against Staffordshire, making five further appearances in that season's competition, before joining Warwickshire for the 1984 season. He made his debut for Warwickshire in that season's County Championship against Leicestershire. He made eighteen further first-class appearances for the county, the last of which came against Middlesex in the 1985 County Championship. In his nineteen first-class matches, he took a total of 37 wickets at an average of 41.02, with best figures of 4/59. With the bat he scored 175, which came at a batting average of 10.93, with a high score of 28. He made his List A debut in the 1984 John Player Special League against Sussex. He nine further List A appearances for Warwickshire, the last of which came against Worcestershire in the 1985 John Player Special League. In his nine appearances, he took 7 wickets at an average of 48.00, with best figures of 2/31. He left Warwickshire at the end of the 1985 season.

He rejoined Cumberland in 1987, between then and 1993 he made 30 Minor Counties Championship appearances and eleven MCCA Knockout Trophy appearances. He also made three List A appearances for Cumberland, against Sussex in the 1987 NatWest Trophy, Worcestershire in the 1988 NatWest Trophy and Lancashire in the 1989 NatWest Trophy. In his three List A appearances for the county, he took 3 wickets at an average of 46.66, with best figures of 3/24.

References

External links
Stephen Wall at ESPNcricinfo
Stephen Wall at CricketArchive

1961 births
Living people
People from Ulverston
English cricketers
Cumberland cricketers
Warwickshire cricketers
Cricketers from Cumbria